The Last Alarm is a 1926 American silent drama film directed by Oscar Apfel and starring Rex Lease, Wanda Hawley, and  Theodore von Eltz.

Cast
 Rex Lease as Tom - a Fireman
 Wanda Hawley as Tom's Sweetheart, a Chorus Girl
 Theodore von Eltz as Joe, Tom's Pal, a Fireman
 Hazel Howell as The Fire Chief's Daughter
 Maurice Costello as The Captain of the Fire Brigade, Tom's Father
 Florence Turner as Warehouse Proprietor's Wife
 Jimmy Aubrey		
 Oscar Apfel

References

Bibliography
 Connelly, Robert B. The Silents: Silent Feature Films, 1910-36, Volume 40, Issue 2. December Press, 1998.
 Munden, Kenneth White. The American Film Institute Catalog of Motion Pictures Produced in the United States, Part 1. University of California Press, 1997.

External links

 

1926 films
1926 drama films
1920s English-language films
American silent feature films
Silent American drama films
Films directed by Oscar Apfel
American black-and-white films
Rayart Pictures films
1920s American films